Johnny Puleo (October 7, 1907 – May 3, 1983) was an American musician and actor who specialized in playing the harmonica.

Born a dwarf (he stood 4 feet 6 inches or 1.37 meters as an adult) in Washington, D.C., he worked as a newspaper seller until being discovered at a contest in Boston held by bandleader Borrah Minevitch, of The Harmonica Rascals. Soon he joined a comedy variety act, during which time he learned the art of pantomime that contributed so much to his success. He then joined the Rascals, with whom he toured the world.

In 1941 Johnny tried to leave the Rascals and start his own group. The entire new group moved in with Johnny's parents, living and rehearsing in the basement. It did not last long, though, because Borrah Minevitch found them and got them working for him again.

After Minevitch's death in 1955, Puleo formed his own band, The Harmonica Gang, to avoid conflict with the Paul Baron Rascals, which took over the original band name in 1956. The group had many albums on Audio Fidelity records starting in 1957, and even released a two record album with the Chimes Family. He also acted in several films, most notably Trapeze (1956).  The Harmonica Gang appeared at top supper clubs throughout the USA, including the famous Latin Quarter in New York and Miami Beach, the Riviera in Las Vegas, Palmer House in Chicago, The Roosevelt in New Orleans, and Twin Coaches in Pittsburgh, as well as venues like the Moulin Rouge and London Palladium overseas.

Puleo and his five-member band released a series of high-energy light-pop LPs on Audio Fidelity Records.  His first album was the first LP to be released in a single-tone-arm stereo format in 1958.  More (at least seven) albums on the Audio Fidelity label followed well into the 1960s.  One of his (and their) best performances is "Sabre Dance", With Master Player Dave Doucette Playing The Lead Harmonica, which, along with several of their other tunes, is posted on YouTube.

He died of a heart attack at Holy Cross Hospital in his native Washington, D.C. in 1983.

Notable performances
He performed in front of such notables as the Royal Command in England and the Presidents of the United States and France. In addition to his mastery of the harmonica, he was a past master of the art of pantomime and a dramatic actor of considerable ability.  Puleo made numerous appearances on The Ed Sullivan Show, The Hollywood Palace, Milton Berle's Variety Show and Steve Allen Show. You can find many of his videos on youtube.com by simply typing in "johnny puleo" in the Search box at the top of their page.

Puleo was one of the first performers to introduce America to using the zip code. In a TV commercial, he climbed up a small ladder and said, "Now remember, use your zip code," as he pointed to a letter going into the mail box.

Filmography

References

1907 births
1983 deaths
American male television actors
20th-century American male actors
Audio Fidelity Records artists
20th-century American musicians
20th-century American male musicians